The Legend of Blacksilver is a fantasy role-playing video game developed by Charles W. Dougherty and John C. Dougherty  of Quest, Inc. and published by Epyx in 1988.  It is an indirect sequel to the game Legacy of the Ancients. Originally designed for the Commodore 64, the game was ported to the Apple II.

Plot

The principal character in the game is first contacted by Princess Aylea in a dream-vision.  They are told that the evil Baron Taragas from the Kingdom of Maelbane has conspired with a local baron, Baron Mantrek, to find a magical material called Blacksilver.  Supposedly in the hands of evil, Blacksilver could be used to create weapons of mass destruction.  Princess Aylea instructs the character to rescue her father, King Durek, who has been abducted by Baron Taragas.

Development

The Legend of Blacksilver uses an improved version of the game engine used in its predecessor, Legacy of the Ancients, which in turn was loosely based on the engine used in the Questron series. The game is written in BASIC supplemented with a few disk, sound, and graphics routines coded in machine language for speed.

Reception
Computer Gaming World gave the game a mixed review, saying, "The game is fine on a technical level, but on an artistic level it seems to be a rehash of a thousand other games, with nothing new or interesting for experienced players."

The game was reviewed in 1989 in Dragon #144 by Hartley, Patricia, and Kirk Lesser in "The Role of Computers" column. The reviewers gave the game 4 out of 5 stars.

References

External links

1988 video games
Apple II games
Commodore 64 games
Epyx games
Role-playing video games
Video games developed in the United States
Single-player video games